Rushall railway station is located on the Mernda line in Victoria, Australia. It serves the north-eastern Melbourne suburb of Fitzroy North, and it opened on 1 January 1927.

History

Named after a nearby street, itself possibly named after a housing development in 1869, Rushall was also a station on the former Inner Circle line, which operated between Clifton Hill and Royal Park until July 1948.

Rushall is located next to the Merri Creek, and is connected to Westgarth by a narrow, 80-metre-long footbridge for pedestrians and cyclists, crossing the Merri Creek as part of the Merri Creek Trail.

Incidents
On 6 February 2016, whilst operating a Flinders Street service, and negotiating the tightest curve on the metropolitan railway system, a trailer carriage of an X'Trapolis train derailed 100m north of the station, resulting in one injury. The line reopened the next day.

On 10 February 2016, another derailment, involving railway track machines, occurred near Rushall. That derailment resulted in buses replacing trains between Clifton Hill and Bell for much of 11 February. The line partially reopened for evening peak-hour commuters later that day.

In music
Melbourne indie band Underground Lovers wrote a song named Rushall Station, about the quietness of the site, which then became the title track for an album. The station is also mentioned in Marcel Borrack's song Ruthven to Rushall.

In October 2016, Melbourne electronic music producer Arcadic released a single named after the station, titled Rushall. The artwork depicted Merri Creek, taken from the window of a train departing Rushall station.

Platforms and services

Rushall has two side platforms. It is serviced by Metro Trains' Mernda line services.

Platform 1:
  all stations and limited express services to Flinders Street

Platform 2:
  all stations services to Mernda

Transport links

Kinetic Melbourne operates two routes via Rushall station, under contract to Public Transport Victoria:
 : Queen Street (Melbourne CBD) – La Trobe University Bundoora Campus
 : Queen Street (Melbourne CBD) – Northland Shopping Centre

Gallery

References

External links
 
 Melway map at street-directory.com.au

Railway stations in Melbourne
Railway stations in Australia opened in 1927
Railway stations in the City of Yarra